Malachi is a Jewish prophet in the Bible.

Malachi or Malachai is also the given name of:

 Malachi ben Jacob HaKohen (1695/70?–1772), Talmudist, methodologist and Kaballist
 Malachi Bogdanov, British theatre director
 Malachi Curran, politician in Northern Ireland
 Malachi Cush (born 1980), Northern Irish singer/songwriter
 Malachi Davis (born 1977), American sprinter
 Malachi Dupre (born 1995), American football player
 Malachi Favors (1927–2004), American jazz bassist
 Malachi Flynn (born 1998), American basketball player
 Malachi Jones (born 1989), Bermudian cricketer
 Malachi Jones (clergyman) (c.1651–1729), Anglo-Welsh clergyman and missionary 
 Malachi Jones (American football) (born 1994), American football player
 Malachi Kittridge (1869-1928), American Major League Baseball catcher
 Malachi Leo Elliott (1886–1967), American architect
 Malachi Martin (1921–1999), Catholic priest, writer and commentator
 Malachi Martin (Australian murderer) (c.1831–1862)
 Malachi Martin (politician) (1822–?), American politician 
 Malachi O'Doherty (born 1951), journalist, author and broadcaster in Northern Ireland
 Malachi Ritscher (1954–2006), American human rights and anti-war activist and musician
 Malachi Thompson (1949–2006), American jazz trumpet player
 Malachi Throne (1928-2013), American actor

See also
Malachy (given name)

Masculine given names
English masculine given names
Hebrew masculine given names